Winterbound is a children's novel by Margery Williams. It is a family story set in a Connecticut farmhouse during the Great Depression. 
Nineteen-year-old Kay and sixteen-year-old Garry are in charge of the house and their younger siblings while their parents are away during the winter. The novel, illustrated by Kate Seredy, was first published in 1936 and was a Newbery Honor recipient in 1937.

References

1936 American novels
American children's novels
Newbery Honor-winning works
Novels set in Connecticut
Great Depression novels
1936 children's books